Milmay is an unincorporated community and census-designated place (CDP) located mostly within Buena Vista Township, in Atlantic County, New Jersey, United States. Part of the CDP extends southwest into Maurice River Township in Cumberland County.

Milmay has a post office with ZIP code 08340.

Demographics

References

Buena Vista Township, New Jersey
Unincorporated communities in Atlantic County, New Jersey
Unincorporated communities in Cumberland County, New Jersey
Unincorporated communities in New Jersey
Census-designated places in Atlantic County, New Jersey
Census-designated places in Cumberland County, New Jersey
Census-designated places in New Jersey